Trox sordidus is a beetle of the Family Trogidae. Trox sordidus was described by John LeConte in 1854, who observed the species in the U.S. states of Georgia, New York and Kansas.

References

sordidus
Beetles described in 1854